Wainwright Airport may refer to:

Canada
 Wainwright, Alberta
 Wainwright Aerodrome (IATA: YWV, ICAO: CYWV), the public aerodrome serving the town and surrounding communities.
 Wainwright (Health Centre) Heliport (TC: CWH2)
 CFB Wainwright
 Wainwright/Camp Wainwright Field Airport (TC: CFF7), located at the base

United States
 Wainwright Airport (Alaska) in Wainwright, Alaska, United States (IATA: AWI, ICAO: PAWI),